Roger Federer defeated Tim Henman in the final, 6–3, 6–3, to win the men's singles tennis title at the 2004 Indian Wells Masters.

Lleyton Hewitt was the two-time defending champion, but lost in the third round to Juan Ignacio Chela.

Seeds
All thirty-three seeds received a bye to the second round.

Draw

Finals

Top half

Section 1

Section 2

Section 3

Section 4

Bottom half

Section 5

Section 6

Section 7

Section 8

References
 2004 Pacific Life Open Draw

2004 Pacific Life Open
Singles